Kirsten Hughes may refer to:

 Kirsten Hughes (actress) (1962–2022), British actress
 Kirsten Hughes (politician), American lawyer, singer, and politician

See also
 Kristen Hughes (netball) (born 1979), Australian netball player